Juan Nepomuceno Cortina Goseacochea (May 16, 1824 – October 30, 1894), also known by his nicknames Cheno Cortina, the Red Robber of the Rio Grande and the  Rio Grande Robin Hood, was a Mexican rancher, politician, military leader, outlaw and folk hero. He was an important caudillo, military general and regional leader, who effectively controlled the Mexican state of Tamaulipas as governor. In borderlands history he is known for leading a paramilitary mounted Mexican Militia in the failed Cortina Wars. The "Wars" were raids targeting Anglo-American civilians whose settlement Cortina opposed near the several leagues of land granted to his wealthy family on both sides of the Rio Grande. Anglo families began immigrating to the Lower Rio Grande Valley after the Mexican Army was defeated by the Anglo-Mexican rebels of the Mexican State of Tejas, in the Texas Revolution.

From 1836 to 1848 when Cortina was 12–24 years old, parts of the Cortina Grant North of the Rio Grande River was in the disputed territory between the Rio Grande and the Nueces Rivers, claimed by both Mexico and the Republic of Texas. The situation had a big impact on Cortina and his perspective on government and power.  When the United States defeated Mexico in the Mexican–American War in 1848, Mexico was forced to cede the disputed territory to Texas. Cortina opposed this concession. However, Cortina's Mexican militia was easily defeated and forced to flee into Mexico when the Texas Rangers, the United States Army and the local militia of Brownsville, Texas and Matamoros, Tamaulipas all organized and fought against his forces. According to Robert Elman, author of Badmen of the West, Cortina was the first "socially motivated border bandit," similar to Catarino Garza and Pancho Villa of later generations. His followers were known as the "Cortinistas."

Early life and political rising

Juan Cortina was born in Camargo, Tamaulipas Mexico, the son of Trinidad Cortina and Estéfana Goseacochea, a wealthy cattle-ranching family. At the time of his birth, his family's Espiritu Santo land grant encompassed more than 260,000 acres.  When he was three, his family relocated to the Rio Grande Valley, as his mother had inherited vast tracts of Espiritu Santo in the area surrounding Matamoros and Brownsville. In 1846, at age 22, he enlisted with a Mexican Army unit commanded by Gen. Mariano Arista, who had arrived at Matamoros in an attempt to stop the advancing forces of Gen. Zachary Taylor. Arista asked Cortina to form a force from the local vaqueros (Mexican cowboys) who worked for him and the nearby ranches. This irregular cavalry regiment (called the "Tamaulipas") was placed under his command, and as the Mexican–American War began, it participated in the battles of Palo Alto and Resaca de la Palma.

With the end of the war and the signing of the Treaty of Guadalupe Hidalgo on February 2, 1848, the Cortina family estates were divided by the new frontier, leaving a vast portion of their lands inside United States territory. Cortina became an important political boss for the South Texas Democratic Party, and although the new local authorities invalidated many of his land claims, he remained a large rancher. Many landowners of Mexican ancestry suffered from this situation as well, and eventually, Cortina came into conflict with an influential group of lawyers and judges of Brownsville, whom he accused of expropriating land from Mexican Texans or "Tejanos", who were unfamiliar with the American legal system. "Flocks of vampires, in the guise of men," he wrote, robbed Mexicans "of their property, incarcerated, chased, murdered, and hunted them like wild beasts". Cortina's own skirmishes with the law steadily intensified, and he was indicted twice on charges of cattle theft. However, he was not arrested due to his already considerable popularity among the poorer Tejanos, who considered this attempt to be nothing but another demonstration of legal harassment by the "Anglos" (the Texans of American origin) to their class. With the self-appointed purpose of defending the rights of this social group, Cortina gathered, trained, and armed a private army, and on many occasions, he used this force to resist the eviction of Tejanos from their lands. As a result, he became a popular leader among the poorer local population, many of whom considered him a hero against the abuse of power by the Anglos.

In 1858, Cortina along with other rancheros attacked what was speculated to be the final surviving members of the Karankawa Indians, a Native American people whose homeland comprised the coastline of southern Texas, "when they were surprised at their hiding place in Texas and were exterminated."

The Cortina Troubles

First Cortina War
The tension between Cortina and the Brownsville authorities broke into violence on 13 July 1859. Brownsville town marshal Robert Shears was brutalizing Cortina's 60-year-old former ranch hand. Cortina happened to pass by, and asked Shears to let him handle the situation; Shears is said to have yelled at him in reply, "What is it to you, you damned Mexican?" Cortina fired a warning shot, then when Shears did not stop, he intervened and shot him in the shoulder. Cortina pulled the man up to his horse and quickly left the scene. On the 28 September he raided and occupied the town with a coterie of seventy men. Cortina's enemies had fled in the meantime, and during the occupation of Brownsville, he issued a famous proclamation to reveal his intentions to both communities. "(...) There is no need of fear. Orderly people and honest citizens are inviolable to us in their persons and interests. Our object, as you have seen, has been to chastise the villainy of our enemies, which heretofore has gone unpunished. These have connived with each other, and form, so to speak, a perfidious inquisitorial lodge to persecute and rob us, without any cause, and for no other crime on our part than that of being of Mexican origin, considering us, doubtless, destitute of those gifts which they themselves do not possess. (...) Mexicans! Peace be with you! Good inhabitants of the State of Texas, look on them as brothers, and keep in mind that which the Holy Spirit saith: "Thou shalt not be the friend of the passionate man; nor join thyself to the madman, lest thou learn his mode of work and scandalize thy soul." (Proverbs 22:24-25)

Cortina retained control over Brownsville until 30 September 1859, when he evacuated the town at the urging of influential residents of Matamoros. The following days, the townsfolk of Brownsville formed a twenty-man group in order to fight Cortina, called "the Brownsville Tigers". In November, the Brownsville Tigers learned that Cortina was at his mother's ranch in the nearby town of Santa Rita, five miles west of Brownsville. They immediately launched an attack, only to be sent into retreat in disarray by Cortina's forces.

Later the same month, the Brownsville Tigers were joined by a group of Texas Rangers, and Cortina decided to attack them. The offensive was unsuccessful, and on December, a second group of Rangers led by Capt. John "Rip" Ford arrived, larger and better organized. Because of appeals from Brownsville citizens, the U.S. Army sent troops from San Antonio to the nearby Fort Brown, which had been abandoned a few years ago. The fort's new commander, Maj. Samuel Heintzelman, united and coordinated all armed groups to put an end to the Cortina threat. Cortina retreated up the Rio Grande, until on December 27, 1859 Heintzelman and Ford engaged him in the Battle of Rio Grande City. Cortina's forces were decisively defeated, losing sixty men and all their equipment. Pursued and defeated by Ford again a few days later, Cortina retreated into the Burgos Mountains. The First Cortina War had finished, and with increasing pressure from both the United States and Mexican Government to cease all hostile activities, Cortina remained away from the scene for more than a year.

Second Cortina War
In May 1861, the much shorter Second Cortina War took place. The American Civil War had just begun, and Cortina, who had aligned himself with the Federal Government of the United States, invaded Zapata County. He was defeated by Confederate Capt. Santos Benavides at the battle of Carrizo, and retreated into Mexico after losing eighteen men. No longer would Cortina conduct large-scale military incursions within the territory of the United States, albeit accusations of promoting guerrilla actions against the richer Texan landowners in the area were numerous throughout the following years.

Later political career
In the following years, Cortina focused on his political career within the state of Tamaulipas. President Benito Juárez appointed him military commander of the forces stationed at the southeastern frontier.

When the French intervention in Mexico began in 1862, Cortina sided with Juárez at first, and took part in the Battle of Puebla on May 5. However, as the French eventually defeated the Mexican forces led by the Gen. Ignacio Zaragoza and succeeded in establishing Archduke Maximilian of Habsburg as Maximilian I, sovereign of Mexico, Cortina sensed the opportunity to consolidate his power in the Tamaulipas region and switched sides by joining the invaders. This alliance was short-lived, and soon Cortina rose against the French. Commanding a large army that he had personally gathered and equipped, he engaged the interventionist forces that had landed near Tampico and defeated them. His further military actions along Central Mexico helped in the effort against the invasion, and he was present at the execution of Maximilian in Querétaro (June 1867). During this time, in the absence of a legal national authority, he appointed himself Governor of Tamaulipas twice - in 1864 and in 1865. He resigned from the office in 1866 in favor of Generals José María Jesús Carbajal and Santiago Tapia.

The attitude of the Anglo American Texans towards Cortina changed completely with the defeat of the Confederacy and his important role in the defense of the Mexican Government, and after returning to his estates in Matamoros in 1870 he was formally invited on several occasions as guest of honor of the city  of Brownsville. His support to the Union motivated many notable residents of the Rio Grande Valley (including a former mayor of Brownsville) to endorse a petition to the Texas Legislature, asking for a formal pardon for his crimes during the Cortina Troubles. Although this motion didn't prosper and was eventually rejected, Cortina had earned the lasting sympathy of most of the local population of both Hispanic and American descent. The Mexican authorities also honored him: he was appointed Brigadier General, and the largest battalion of the state of Tamaulipas was renamed "el Batallón Cortina" (the "Cortina Battalion").

Arrest and exile
Cortina supported General Porfirio Díaz, military hero of the French intervention in Mexico and political rival of Benito Juárez and his successor Sebastián Lerdo de Tejada.  Cortina attempted to raise an army from the local population and sheltered Díaz following his failed rising. Repeated accusations against Cortina by wealthy landowners in Texas of conducting cross-border raids against their cattle and properties were eventually heeded by the Lerdo's administration, and used as public justification to detain him. In 1875, Cortina was arrested and brought to Mexico City.

On 29 November 1876, Díaz overthrew President Lerdo in the Plan of Tuxtepec, which saw his re-election as a violation of the Constitution of 1857. Cortina was allowed to return to Tamaulipas, where he once again tried to raise an armed force. But before he could put this new army to any use, Díaz ordered his arrest and confinement within Mexico City for the second time.

Many factors contributed to Díaz's decision, the main ones being Cortina's ambition to power within Tamaulipas above anything, and the consequent unreliability and instability of his support, as he had already demonstrated many times in his life. Díaz had also received a large sum of money, estimated from anywhere between $50,000 to $200,000 from the wealthy South Texas ranchers to finance his seizure of power with the condition that, in turn, he would take care of stopping Cortina's raids on United States territory. Most important, Díaz was determined to remain in absolute control of the Government (as he did for the subsequent thirty-three years), no matter the means involved, and he systematically removed all traces of opposition that could have challenged his will. Also, with diplomatic pressure coming from the United States Government, which was concerned about Cortina's ambitions in Cameron County and his behavior in the past, the President decreed the arrest and execution of his former ally.

Gen. José Canales, a longtime enemy of Cortina who was sent to carry out the order, decided to bring him to Mexico City instead, fearing the popular reprisals from the people of Tamaulipas. His old nemesis, John S. Ford, also interceded on his behalf.  He was kept at the military prison of Santiago Tlaltelolco, without being tried or sentenced. He remained there until 1890, when he was removed from prison and placed under house arrest in a comfortable home in Azcapotzalco, northwest of Mexico City. Cortina remained there until his death on October 30, 1894.

In popular culture

 Documentary on 'History On Point' "Juan Cortina’s Raid of Brownsville, TX 1859: Part 1" https://historyonpoint.com/podcast/raid-of-brownsville-part-1-juan-cortina/
 Cortina is the subject of Oscar Chávez's song, "Corrido de Juan Cortina".
Charles B. Griffith wrote a script to be directed by Roger Corman about Cortina called Devil on Horseback in 1955 - it was never made
 He was portrayed by Joaquim de Almeida in the 1999 film One Man's Hero
 In the Law & Order episode "Boy Gone Astray", Connie Rubirosa mentioned that Cortina was one of her ancestors.
 Jack Elam portrayed Cortina in the 1961 episode, "The General Without a Cause" on the syndicated television anthology series, Death Valley Days, hosted by Stanley Andrews.
 The 1996 documentary film, The West by Ken Burns, presents a section on Juan Cortina directed by Stephen Ives.
 In the novel Texas by Carmen Boullosa, the character Don Nepomuceno is based on Cortina.

References

Further reading

 
Juan Cortina and the Texas-Mexico frontier (1859–1877), by Jerry D. Thompson, Southwestern Studies, 1994.
"Cheno Cortina", the Tamaulipas man who invaded Texas, by Adrián Cerda, Editorial Contenido, 2001.
Juan Cortina and the Struggle for Justice in Texas, by Carlos Larralde and José R. Jacobo, Kendall Hunt, 2000.
Cortina:  Defending the Mexican Name in Texas, by Jerry Thompson, Texas A&M Press, 2007.
Juan N. Cortina Bandit or Patriot? An Address by J.T. Canales to the Lower Rio Grande Valley Historical Association. 22 October 1951.
U. S. Congress, House, Difficulties on the Southwestern Frontier, 36th Congress, 1st Session, 1860, H. Exec. Doc. 52, pp. 70–82.
Texas Politics & the Legends of the Fall, by Robert H. Angell, McGraw Custom Publishing. 2003. pp. 23–36.
. Accessed on September 7, 2005.
Juan Nepomuceno Cortina, el Chino. Accessed on September 7, 2005.

External links
 New perspectives on the West: Juan Cortina, PBS
 Proclamations by Cortina, PBS
 Remembering the Birthday of Juan Cortina, The 'Robin Hood of the Rio Grande', NBC

1824 births
1894 deaths
Mexican generals
Governors of Tamaulipas
People from Texas
People from Tamaulipas
Mexican people of the Mexican–American War
Liberalism in Mexico
Mexican rebels